The brown-headed snake (Furina tristis) is a small venomous reptile native to the Cape York peninsula in northeastern Australia.

References

Venomous snakes
Furina
Snakes of Australia
Reptiles described in 1858
Taxa named by Albert Günther